Zhekov is a Bulgarian masculine surname, its feminine counterpart is Zhekova. It may refer to
Aleksandra Zhekova (born 1987), Bulgarian snowboarder 
Andrey Zhekov, Bulgarian volleyball player 
Nikola Zhekov (1864–1949), Bulgarian statesman 
Petar Zhekov (born 1944), Bulgarian football player 
Slavi Zhekov (born 1976), Bulgarian football player
Stanislav Zhekov (born 1980), Bulgarian football player

Bulgarian-language surnames